Castaway Bay is a tropical-themed indoor water park resort owned and operated by Cedar Fair. The water park, located near Cedar Point in Sandusky, Ohio, opened on November 5, 2004. In addition to hotel rooms and suites, the resort features a  game room, restaurants, retail shops, and other amenities.

History
Castaway Bay originally opened in 1989 as the Radisson Harbor Inn. Cedar Fair bought a 99% share of the Radisson Harbor Inn for $2.3 million in 1996. On July 15, 2003, it was announced the company was exploring plans to refurbish the hotel into an indoor water park resort. Castaway Bay was officially announced on November 13. 2003. The property re-opened as Castaway Bay about a year later on November 5, 2004. On January 1, 2015, the TGI Fridays restaurant located inside the hotel closed. It was replaced by Quaker Steak and Lube in May.

For 2022, the water park is undergoing a renovation with new branding across the property, including renovated rooms, and common spaces. The park introduced a set of mascots to promote the water park, including "Gordy the turtle", whom is included in the new version of the Castaway Bay logo.

Dining
Castaway Bay has 5 dining options, Big Daddy's Snack Shack which is located inside the Waterpark, Ebb & Eddy's, Bay Harbor, Quaker Steak & Lube (formerly a TGI Friday's), and a breakfast buffet; Mango Mike's.

Slides and attractions

See also
 Cedar Point
 List of Cedar Fair water parks

References

External links
 Official Site
 Castaway Bay Photo Gallery

Cedar Fair water parks
Water parks in Ohio
Hotels in Ohio
Buildings and structures in Sandusky, Ohio
Tourist attractions in Erie County, Ohio
2004 establishments in Ohio
Tourist attractions in Sandusky, Ohio